Dobrovský (masculine) or Dobrovská (feminine) is a Czech surname. Notable people with the surname include:

Josef Dobrovský (1753–1829), Bohemian philologist and historian, important in the Czech national revival
Luboš Dobrovský (1932–2020), Czech journalist and politician, former Czechoslovak minister of defence

See also
Dobrovsky (disambiguation)
Dąbrowski (disambiguation)

Czech-language surnames